The 2024 U Sports University Cup is scheduled to be held in March 2024, in Toronto, Ontario, to determine a national champion for the 2023–24 U Sports men's ice hockey season.

Host
The tournament is scheduled to be played at the Mattamy Athletic Centre and will be hosted by Toronto Metropolitan University. This will be the first time that Toronto Metropolitan University will host the tournament, but it will be the 14th time that the championship will be played in Toronto.

Scheduled teams
Canada West Champion
OUA Champion
AUS Champion
Host (TMU Bold)
Two assigned berths from OUA
One assigned berth from Canada West
One assigned berth from AUS

References

External links 
 Tournament Web Site

U Sports men's ice hockey
Ice hockey competitions in Toronto
University Cup, 2024